B. bigelovii may refer to:

Baccharis bigelovii, Bigelow's false willow, a flowering plant species
Bahia bigelovii, Bigelow's bahia, a flowering plant species
Bidens bigelovii, Bigelow's beggarticks, a flowering plant species
Brandegea bigelovii, the desert starvine, a flowering plant species